Tyrell Goulbourne (born January 26, 1994) is a Canadian professional ice hockey forward who currently plays for the Ontario Reign of the American Hockey League (AHL). He has formerly played parts of two seasons in the National Hockey League (NHL) for the Philadelphia Flyers. He was drafted by the Flyers in the third round of the 2013 NHL Entry Draft.

Playing career
Goulbourne was drafted in the 5th round, 105th overall, by the Kelowna Rockets in the 2009 WHL Bantam Draft. In 2013, Goulbourne was named an assistant captain for the Rockets and was drafted in the third round of the 2013 NHL Entry Draft by the Philadelphia Flyers. He played with the Rockets for two more seasons before signing an entry level contract with the Flyers on March 3, 2015.

Goulbourne was assigned to the Flyers American Hockey League (AHL) affiliate, the Lehigh Valley Phantoms for the 2015–16 season. He struggled in his first two AHL seasons, only earning 18 points in a combined 97 games, and was reassigned to the Reading Royals in the ECHL. He described the demotion as "hitting rock bottom" and eventually created enough consistency to play back in the AHL the following season.

Goulbourne began the 2017–18 season in the American Hockey League. He was recalled on January 3 and Goulbourne made his NHL debut on January 6, 2018, against the St. Louis Blues. He re-signed a one year contract with the Flyers organization on July 15, 2018.

After four seasons within the Flyers organization, Goulbourne left as a free agent to sign a two-year, two-way $700,000 contract with the Vegas Golden Knights on July 1, 2019.

Goulbourne never made an appearance with the Golden Knights during his contract with the club, leaving as a free agent to continue his career in the AHL by agreeing to a one-year contract with the Belleville Senators, affiliate of the Ottawa Senators, on August 10, 2021.

In the 2021–22 season, Goulbourne made just 9 appearances with Belleville before he was later re-assigned to ECHL club, the Atlanta Gladiators. While with the Gladiators, Goulbourne was traded from the Senators to the Stockton Heat as a part of future considerations trade involving goalie Michael McNiven on March 21, 2022.

On September 6, 2022 Goulbourne announced his retirement from professional hockey via a post on his personal Instagram. Goulbourne's retirement was short lived as he opted to resume his professional career by signing a professional tryout contract with the Ontario Reign of the AHL, affiliate to the Los Angeles Kings, on January 5, 2023.

Personal life
Goulbourne was raised in Edmonton, Alberta, to parents Mark and Georgia Goulbourne. His mother is of Jamaican heritage and moved to Canada while in her teens and his father is a music producer.

Career statistics

References

External links

1994 births
Living people
Atlanta Gladiators players
Belleville Senators players
Canadian ice hockey left wingers
Canadian people of Jamaican descent
Chicago Wolves players
Henderson Silver Knights players
Kelowna Rockets players
Lehigh Valley Phantoms players
Ontario Reign (AHL) players
Philadelphia Flyers draft picks
Philadelphia Flyers players
Reading Royals players
Ice hockey people from Edmonton
Stockton Heat players